Lea-Artibai is an eskualdea/comarca of the province of Biscay (Bizkaia), in the Basque Country, Spain. Lea-Artibai is the heir of the historical merindad of Markina, which was one of the merindades of Biscay. Currently, Lea-Artibai is one of the seven comarcas that compose the province. Its capital city is Markina-Xemein.

Geography 

Lea-Artibai is located at the northeast extreme of the province. It limits with the comarcas of Busturialdea at west and Durangaldea at south, while the province of Gipuzkoa is at the east. The Bay of Biscay sits on the north. It occupies the drainage basin of the rivers Lea and Artibai.

Municipalities 

Note: + created from part of Markina-Xemein in 2005.

Transport 

Lea-Artibai is the only comarca of Biscay that does not have a single kilometer of highway or railway. Its communications are deficient and depend on roads, like the BI-633 that connects Ondarroa with Durango or the BI-2405 which connects Ondarroa with Lekeitio.

Economy 

The economy of the municipalities of Lea-Artibai are based on the primary sector, while some industries, like one of fish preservation exist too.

References

External links
 
Lea-Artibai's official web page

Comarcas of Biscay